Pierre de Milard (often referred to as Chevalier Milard, also spelled Chevalier Millard; 1736–1778) was a French Navy officer, who became a senior officer and noble in the Royal Burmese Armed Forces. He had a key role in supporting the Burmese military efforts against Siam and Qing China. He was lavishly rewarded for his efforts, and made the governor of Tabe. De Milard was very close to King Hsinbyushin. Suffering from a long illness in his last years, the Burmese king asked de Milard on a few occasions to sleep in the same room in order to guard against possible attempts on his life.

Brief
In 1756, Pierre de Milard was a member of a French navy force of two or three warships sent to Syriam to provide reinforcements and supplies to the forces of Hanthawaddy in the Konbaung–Hanthawaddy War. The force was to join the French officer Sieur de Bruno who was helping defend the city of Syriam against a Konbaung attack. However, the Konbaung leader Alaungpaya managed to capture Syriam in July 1756. The two French ships with reinforcements and supplies were also captured by Alaungpaya when Alaungpaya forced Bruno to write a letter to trick them. The French captains were killed and the sailors forced to join the Burmese army.

Chevalier Milard was among the soldiers who were forced into the Burmese army. He was only 20 years old when he was captured. The incorporated French troops with their guns and muskets played a key role in the later battles between the Burmese and the Mons. They became an elite corps, which was to play a role in the Burmese battles against the Siamese (attacks and capture of Ayutthaya from 1759 to 1767) and the Chinese (battles against the Chinese armies of the Qianlong Emperor from 1766 to 1769).

Ultimately Chevalier Milard was nominated Captain of the Guard and Master of the Ordnance for the Konbaung dynasty.

Milard was involved in the reopening of contacts between the Burmese and the French as Burma was looking for supplies of weapons for its conflicts with the Siamese and the Manchu Chinese. Commercial contacts resumed in 1770 and Milard arranged the visit of the French envoy M. Feraud and the re-establishment of the French shipyard in Rangoon.

Milard was very close to the Burmese ruler Hsinbyushin and for some time slept in the same room as him in order to protect him against possible attacks linked to a succession dispute.

Chevalier Milard was also noted for his charitable activities towards schools and churches, thereby promoting Western education in Burma. He died in 1778. He was buried near the village of Ngayabya in the Sagaing district. His tombstone, written in Latin and Burmese was transferred by the Archaeological Department of Burma in 1924 for preservation. His tombstone records that he fought for the Burmese kings in his campaigns against Hanthawaddy Pegu, Ayutthaya and Manipur as "Captain of the Feringhis" ("Captain of the French"), with the title of Thiri Yazathu Khyawhthin, baron (myosa) of Tabe in the Sagaing district.

See also
 France-Burma relations

Notes

References
 Coupland, Sir Reginald British Empire History. Burma''' Editor Sir Reginald Coupland 
Findlay, Ronald and O'Rourke, Kevin H. (2007) Power and Plenty: Trade, War, and the World Economy in the Second Millennium 
Harvey G. E., History of Burma: From the Earliest Times to 10 March 1824'', Asian Educational Services, 2000 ,  

French soldiers
Military history of Myanmar
1736 births
1778 deaths